Flavelle is a surname. Notable people with the surname include:

Ellsworth Flavelle (1892–1977), Canadian baronet
John Flavelle (1863–1947), British tennis player
Joseph Flavelle (1858–1939), Canadian businessman
Flavelle baronets